Crocosmia, also known as montbretia, is a small genus of flowering plants in the iris family, Iridaceae. It is native to the grasslands of southern and eastern Africa, ranging from South Africa to Sudan. One species is endemic to Madagascar.

Description
They can be evergreen or deciduous perennials that grow from basal underground corms. The alternate leaves are cauline and ensiform (sword shaped). The blades are parallel-veined. The margin is entire. The corms form in vertical chains with the youngest at the top and oldest and largest buried most deeply in the soil. The roots of the lowermost corm in a chain are contractile roots and drag the corm deeper into the ground where conditions allow. The chains of corms are fragile and easily separated, a quality that has enabled some species to become invasive and difficult to control in the garden.

They have colourful inflorescences of 4 to 20 vivid red and orange subopposite flowers on a divaricately (horizontally) branched stem. The terminal inflorescence can have the form of a cyme or a raceme. These flower from early summer well into fall. The flowers are sessile on a flexuose arched spike. The fertile flowers are hermaphroditic. All stamens have an equal length. The style branches are apically forked. They are pollinated by insects, birds (sunbirds) or by the wind. The dehiscent capsules are shorter than they are wide.

The genus name is derived from the Greek words krokos, meaning "saffron", and osme, meaning "odor" – from the dried leaves emitting a strong smell like that of saffron (a spice derived from Crocus – another genus belonging to the Iridaceae) – when immersed in hot water.

The alternative name montbretia is still widely used, especially for the garden hybrid C. × crocosmiiflora. "Montbretia" commonly used in the British Isles for orange-flowered C. × crocosmiiflora cultivars that have naturalised, while "crocosmia" is reserved for less aggressive red-flowered cultivars. Montebretia is a heterotypic synonym of the genus Tritonia in which some species of Crocosmia were once included.

Species 
Species accepted by World Checklist of Selected Plant Families
 Crocosmia ambongensis (H.Perrier) Goldblatt &  – Madagascar 
 Crocosmia aurea  (Pappe ex Hook.) Planch. (Falling Stars) – eastern + southern Africa from Cape Province to Sudan; naturalised in Azores 
 Crocosmia × crocosmiiflora (Lemoine) N.E.Br. - South Africa; naturalised in parts of Europe, Rwanda, Zaire, Assam, Norfolk Island in Australia, Fiji, the Caribbean, Argentina, Tristan da Cunha       (C. aurea × C. pottsii) 
 Crocosmia fucata  (Lindl.) M.P.de Vos – Kamiesberg Mountains in Cape Province of South Africa 
 Crocosmia masoniorum  (L.Bolus) N.E.Br. (Giant montbretia) – Cape Province, KwaZulu-Natal
 Crocosmia mathewsiana  (L.Bolus) Goldblatt ex M.P.de Vos – Drakensberg Mountains in Mpumalanga
 Crocosmia paniculata  (Klatt) Goldblatt (Aunt Eliza) – Lesotho, Eswatini, South Africa
 Crocosmia pearsei Oberm. – Lesotho, Free State, Drakensberg Mountains in Mpumalanga
 Crocosmia pottsii  (Baker) N.E.Br. (Pott's montbretia) – Cape Province, KwaZulu-Natal

Garden hybrids 
 Crocosmia × curtonus
 Crocosmia × crocosmiiflora

Cultivation
Crocosmias are grown worldwide, and more than 400 cultivars have been produced. Some hybrids have become invasive, especially C. × crocosmiiflora hybrids, which are invasive in the UK,  Ireland, Australia, New Zealand,
 North Carolina,  and the  West Coast of the United States.

Crocosmia are winter-hardy in temperate regions. They can be propagated through division, removing offsets from the corm in spring.

The following cultivars have gained the Royal Horticultural Society's Award of Garden Merit:
 
Crocosmia 'Hellfire'  
 Crocosmia 'Lucifer' 
 Crocosmia masoniorum 

Crocosmia 'Paul's Best Yellow'  
 Crocosmia 'Severn Sunrise' 
Crocosmia × crocosmiiflora 'Babylon'  

 Crocosmia × crocosmiiflora 'Star of the East' 
 

Other cultivars include:
 Crocosmia curtonus 'Lucifer', scarlet

Gallery

References

External links
 
 De Vos, M. P. (1999) "Crocosmia". Flora of Southern Africa 7: 129-138.
 Peter Goldblatt, John Manning, Gary Dunlop, Auriol Batten - Crocosmia and Chasmanthe (Royal Horticultural Society Plant Collector Guide)
 Kostelijk, P.J. (1984) "Crocosmia in gardens". The Plantsman 5: 246-253.

Iridaceae genera
Iridaceae
Garden plants
Flora of Africa